

List of Ambassadors

Roi Rosenblit (Non-Resident, Dakar) 2018 - 
Paul Hirschson (Non-Resident, Dakar) 2015 - 2018
Hagay Dikan 1961 - 1963
Shlomo Hillel 1959 - 1961

References

Guinea
Israel